Under the Influence — 21 Years of Flying Nun Records is a double album that includes tracks by various bands signed or related to the Flying Nun Records label.

The album was planned as a celebration of the 21st anniversary of Flying Nun Records.  Bands invited to be part of the album were asked to record one or two songs; if two songs, then one should be a cover of a Flying Nun song that influenced or inspired them and the other song should be a new and unreleased song of their own. These were all to be recorded on a single day at York Street Studio on 22 March 2002.

Track listing

CD1
 "Crazy I Know" – Gerling
 "Japanese Girls" – Pan Am
 "Outer Space" – Betchadupa
 "Gentle Hour" – The Clean
 "Heavenly Pop Hit" – Garageland
 "Unnecessary Evil" – The Hasselhoff Experiment
 "Joe 90" – The D4
 "Death and the Maiden" – Stephen Malkmus
 "If I Were You" – Tall Dwarfs
 "Inner Silenced" – HDU with Shayne Carter

CD2
 "Friday in the Ground" – Chris Knox
 "Get Loose" – The D4
 "Saskatchewan" – Pan Am
 "Graduation of Frustration" – Garageland
 "Bad Food and Long Drives" – Betchadupa
 "Brain That Wouldn't Die" – The Hasselhoff Experiment
 "Man on the Verge of a Nervous Breakdown" – HDU with Shayne Carter
 "Same Old New World" – Graeme Downes
 "Corridor" – The Clean

Photography and film
The recording session also resulted in a number of spin-off works:
 A photographic exhibition by photographer Fraser Harding 
 A feature-length documentary Heavenly Pop Hits 
 A music video of Stephen Malkmus' rendition of The Verlaines' "Death and the Maiden"

References

External links
Flying Nun Records official website
Gallery of official recording session photos
Official website of recording session and cover artwork photographer Fraser Harding
York Street Studios official website
Radio New Zealand interview about the Flying Nun Records' 21st anniversary

2002 compilation albums